The Zhongshan Sports Centre Stadium is a multi-purpose stadium in Zhongshan, China. It is located in the Guangdong province and it is currently used mostly for football matches. The venue is also used for athletics and other events. It has a capacity of 12,000. It became the largest sports venue by capacity in the city of Zhongshan. Two stands are covered with a roof.

References

Athletics (track and field) venues in China
Football venues in China
Multi-purpose stadiums in China
Zhongshan